Kankakee  is a city in and the county seat of Kankakee County, Illinois, United States. As of 2020, the city's population was 24,052. Kankakee is a principal city of the Kankakee-Bourbonnais-Bradley Metropolitan Statistical Area. It serves as an anchor city in the rural plains outside Chicago, similar to Aurora and Joliet.

History
The city's name is probably derived from a corrupted version of the Miami-Illinois word , meaning: "Open country/exposed land/land in open/land exposed to view", in reference to the area's prior status as a marsh. Kankakee was founded in 1854.

Geography

The Kankakee River runs through Kankakee. It is approximately 133 miles long and serves as a major attraction and defining landmark of Kankakee. The river water is refined at the Kankakee water company, and electricity is generated at the Kankakee River Dam, providing vital resources to the community. Its winding path, including inlets and eddies, creates desirable fishing conditions for outdoor enthusiasts.

Climate

Demographics

2020 census

Note: the US Census treats Hispanic/Latino as an ethnic category. This table excludes Latinos from the racial categories and assigns them to a separate category. Hispanics/Latinos can be of any race.

2000 Census
As of the census of 2000, there were 27,561 people, 10,020 households and 6,272 families residing within the city. The racial makeup of the city was 50.92% White, 41.07% African American, 0.27% Native American, 0.32% Asian, 0.03% Pacific Islander, 5.50% from other races, and 1.90% from two or more races. Hispanic or Latino of any race were 9.25% of the population.

There were 10,020 households, out of which 34.4% had children under the age of 18 living with them, 36.4% were married couples living together, 21.2% had a female householder with no
husband present, and 37.4% were non-families. 31.5% of all households were made up of individuals, and 13.9% had someone living alone who was 65 years of age or older. The average household size was 2.60, and the average family size was 3.28.

In the city, the population was spread out, with 29.5% under the age of 18, 9.7% from 18 to 24, 28.7% from 25 to 44, 18.7% from 45 to 64, and 13.4% who were 65 years of age or older. The median age was 32 years. For every 100 females, there were 91.8 males. For every 100 females age 18 and over, there were 86.2 males.

The median income for a household in the city was $30,469, and the median income for a family was $36,428. Males had a median income of $30,894 versus $22,928 for females. The per capita income for the city was $15,479. About 18.1% of families and 21.4% of the population were below the poverty line, including 29.3% of those under age 18 and 11.7% of those age 65 or over.

Arts and culture

Library service is provided by the Kankakee Public Library.

Architecture
Frank Lloyd Wright designed two houses in the Riverview section of the city, located on South Harrison Ave. The B. Harley Bradley House and the Warren Hickox House both still stand today.
 The current Kankakee courthouse was built from 1909 to 1912 in the Neo-classical Revivalist style in the wake of the 1893 Columbian Exposition (the Chicago World's Fair) as part of the City Beautiful movement. The architect was Zachary Taylor Davis who had previously worked with Frank Lloyd Wright when both worked as draftsmen for Louis Sullivan.

Parks and recreation

Kankakee Valley Park District
Facilities include an indoor ice skating rink, a recreation center, dog park, campground and a 72 boat slip marina on the Kankakee River. Fishing is plentiful as the district has 13 riverfront parks as well as a  stocked quarry.

The city has two softball complexes that have both been inducted into the Softball Hall of Fame. They host annual state and international tournaments drawing nearly 50,000 spectators throughout the year. Some Kankakee youth baseball leagues have won state championships.

Government

Kankakee is governed by the mayor council system. The city council consists of fourteen members who are elected from seven wards (two per ward). The mayor and city clerk are elected in a citywide vote.

Education

Higher education
Organized in 1966 by a group of citizens, Kankakee Community College was established to provide a post-secondary educational resource for the people of the Kankakee area.

Primary and secondary education
Public schools are part of the Kankakee School District 111, which includes five elementary schools (Edison, Mark Twain, Lincoln Cultural Center Montessori, Steuben, and Taft), two middle schools (Kennedy and King), one junior high school (Kankakee Junior High), and one high school (Kankakee High), which from 1966 to 1983 was two separate high schools, Eastridge and Westview.

There are three private high schools: Bishop McNamara Catholic School (Catholic), Grace Christian Academy (non-denominational), and Kankakee Trinity Academy (inter-denominational).

Infrastructure

Transportation

Airport

Kankakee is served by the Greater Kankakee Airport, a general aviation facility located in the southern portion of Kankakee.

Railroads
Amtrak provides service to Kankakee from the Kankakee Amtrak Station. Amtrak operates the City of New Orleans, the Illini, and the Saluki with each train running once daily in both directions.

Highways
Interstate 57 runs east–west in the southern part of the city and turns north–south in the eastern part of Kankakee. United States Highways US 45 and US 52 run concurrently forming, along with Illinois Route IL 50, the major north–south thoroughfares through Kankakee. Illinois Route IL 17 is the major east–west road that bisects the city.

Public transportation
The River Valley Metro Mass Transit District (RVMMTD; River Valley Metro or METRO, for short) operates the region's transit bus system. Service runs seven days a week to locations in Kankakee as well as the nearby cities of Aroma Park, Bradley, Bourbonnais, and Manteno. All of the Kankakee routes are stationed out of the Chestnut & North Schuyler Transfer Station. River Valley Metro operates 12 fixed-regular bus routes and 2 commuter routes. The Midway and University Park commuter routes were added January 5, 2014, and in August 2015 River Valley Metro added a second Midway route to its schedule. In January 2016, a second University Park route was added.

In popular culture 
The movie The Accountant (2016) showcases Kankakee by directly mentioning the town as well as displaying Kankakee High School hats on some of the actors.
The movie The Unborn (2009) was partially filmed in Samuel H. Shapiro Developmental Center in Kankakee. Other movies to have been filmed in Kankakee County are The Hunter (1980) and Child's Play (1988).
Kankakee is mentioned in several songs:
"Innocent Bessie Brown", words and music by Irving Berlin, written in 1910, sung by the Broadway performer Ethel Green
"They Are Night Zombies!! They Are Neighbors!! They Have Come Back from the Dead!! Ahhhh!", words and music by Sufjan Stevens, from his 2005 album "Illinois"
"City of New Orleans", words and music by Steve Goodman
"Lydia the Tattooed Lady", words and music by Yip Harburg and Harold Arlen A song first appearing in the Marx Brothers movie At the Circus (1939) and became one of Groucho Marx's signature tunes.
"Took Her to the O" by Chicago rapper King Von
This American Life on April 10, 2015, analyzed Kankakee and its title of the worst city in America.
 In 1999, the city was mocked on the Late Show with David Letterman after being named America's worst place to live. As a gag, David Letterman donated two gazebos to the city in the hopes it would proclaim itself as "The home of the world famous twin gazebos." In 2015, the gazebos were torn down and a rocking chair was built from the wood, and was sent to Letterman for his retirement. This was organized by Kankakee students who felt the gazebos were symbols of a past they wanted to forget.

See also
 Kankakee Outwash Plain
 List of people from Kankakee

References

 List of Kankakee Valley Park District Activities and Offerings
 Description of Kankakee from Illinois.com

External links

 City of Kankakee, Historical Encyclopedia of Illinois, Volume 2 by Newton Bateman
 
 Official City page
 Kankakee Regional Chamber of Commerce
  St. Joseph-Kankakee Portage--Its Location and Use by Marquette, La Salle and the French Voyageurs'' by George A. Baker, 1899, page 11
 "Kankakee Knows What's Coming," Life magazine, vol. 30, no. 1, January 1, 1951

 
Cities in Illinois
Cities in Kankakee County, Illinois
County seats in Illinois
Metropolitan areas of Illinois
1865 establishments in Illinois
Majority-minority cities and towns in Kankakee County, Illinois